The 2020–21 Army Black Knights men's basketball team represented the United States Military Academy during the 2020–21 NCAA Division I men's basketball season. The Black Knights were led by fifth-year head coach Jimmy Allen, and played their home games at Christl Arena in West Point, New York as members of the Patriot League. They finished the season 12–10, 7–7 in Patriot League play to finish in second place in the North Division. They earned the fourth seed in the Patriot League tournament, losing in the semifinals to Loyola. They were invited to the College Basketball Invitational (the program's first ever invititation to this tournament) where they lost to Bellarmine in the quarterfinals.

Previous season
The Black Knights finished the 2020–21 season with a record of 15–15, 10–8 in Patriot League play to finish in a tie for fourth place. They lost in the quarterfinals of the Patriot League tournament to Lafayette.

Roster

Schedule and results

|-
!colspan=9 style=| Non-conference regular season
|-

|-
!colspan=9 style=| Patriot League regular season

|-
!colspan=9 style=| Patriot League tournament
|-

|-
!colspan=9 style=| College Basketball Invitational
|-

Source

Notes

References

Army Black Knights men's basketball seasons
Army
Army Black Knights men's basketball
Army Black Knights men's basketball
Army